Wide River is the fifteenth album by American rock band the Steve Miller Band, released in 1993. The title track was their last Billboard Hot 100 single, peaking at No. 64. It would be Steve Miller Band's last studio album until Bingo! 17 years later in June 2010. , sales in the United States have exceeded 258,000 copies, according to Nielsen SoundScan.  It was re-released  on vinyl by Sailor Records in 2016. In addition, May 24, 2019 saw the re-release again of Wide River on exclusive translucent light blue vinyl, by UMe Label, and on black vinyl.

Track listing

Personnel 
 Steve Miller – vocals, guitar, producer, mixing
 Billy Peterson – bass guitar, piano
 Gordy Knutson – drums, percussion
 Bob Mallach – saxophone
 Norton Buffalo – harmonica

 Additional personnel

 Ben Sidran – keyboards
 Leo Sidran – keyboards, guitar
 David Denny – guitar
 Jay Bird Koder – guitar
 Joey Heinemann – piano

 Production
 Steve Wiese – recording engineer, mixing
 Rick Fisher – recording engineer

Notes 

Steve Miller Band albums
1993 albums
Polydor Records albums